was a  after Jiryaku and before Jōhō. This period spanned the years from April 1069 through August 1074.

Change of Era
 1069: The new era name was created to mark an event or series of events. The previous era ended and the new one commenced in Jiryaku 5, on the 13th day of the 4th month of 1069.

Events of the Enkyū Era
 1069 (Enkyū 1): The consort of the newly elevated emperor was raised to the status of chūgū.
 1072 (Enkyū 4, 8th day of the 12th month): In the 6th year of Emperor Go-Sanjō-tennōs reign (桓武天皇6年), the emperor in  favor of his son, and the succession (senso) was received by his son. Shortly thereafter, Emperor Shirakawa is said to have acceded to the throne (sokui).
 1073 (Enkyū 5, 21st day of the 4th month): Go-Sanjō entered the Buddhist priesthood; and his new priestly name became Kongō-gyō.
 1073 (Enkyū 5, 7th day of the 5th month): The former-Emperor Go-Sanjō died at the age of 40.

References

Sources
 Brown, Delmer M. and Ichirō Ishida, eds. (1979).  Gukanshō: The Future and the Past. Berkeley: University of California Press. ;  OCLC 251325323
 Nussbaum, Louis-Frédéric and Käthe Roth. (2005).  Japan encyclopedia. Cambridge: Harvard University Press. ;  OCLC 58053128
 Titsingh, Isaac. (1834). Nihon Odai Ichiran; ou,  Annales des empereurs du Japon.  Paris: Royal Asiatic Society, Oriental Translation Fund of Great Britain and Ireland. OCLC 5850691
 Varley, H. Paul. (1980). A Chronicle of Gods and Sovereigns: Jinnō Shōtōki of Kitabatake Chikafusa.'' New York: Columbia University Press. ;  OCLC 6042764

External links
 National Diet Library, "The Japanese Calendar" -- historical overview plus illustrative images from library's collection

Japanese eras